Nicholas Burfitt (born 17 December 1966) is a British rower. He competed at the 1988 Summer Olympics and the 1992 Summer Olympics.

References

External links
 

1966 births
Living people
British male rowers
Olympic rowers of Great Britain
Rowers at the 1988 Summer Olympics
Rowers at the 1992 Summer Olympics
People from Keynsham
20th-century British people